Follow Your Heart is a 2017 Philippine television reality show broadcast by GMA Network. Hosted by Heart Evangelista, it premiered on April 23, 2017 on the network's Sunday Grande line up replacing People vs. the Stars. The show concluded on July 16, 2017 with a total of 13 episodes. It was replaced by Road Trip in its timeslot.

Hosts

 Heart Evangelista
 Terry Gian

Ratings
According to AGB Nielsen Philippines' Nationwide Urban Television Audience Measurement People in television homes, the pilot episode of Follow Your Heart earned a 3.9% rating. While the final episode scored a 4.7% rating.

References

External links
 
 

2017 Philippine television series debuts
2017 Philippine television series endings
Filipino-language television shows
GMA Network original programming
GMA Integrated News and Public Affairs shows
Philippine reality television series